Vladimir Balynetc (born 25 April 1985) is a powerlifter from Russia. At the 2012 Summer Paralympics he won a silver medal in the men's 48 kg powerlifting event, lifting .

In November 2013, he served as one of the torch bearers in Yakutsk for the 2014 Winter Olympics torch relay.

References 

Paralympic silver medalists for Russia
Powerlifters at the 2012 Summer Paralympics
1985 births
Living people
Russian powerlifters
Medalists at the 2012 Summer Paralympics
Paralympic powerlifters of Russia
Paralympic medalists in powerlifting
21st-century Russian people